The Massachusetts Metaphysical College was founded in 1881 by Mary Baker Eddy in Boston, Massachusetts, to teach her school of Christian Science metaphysical healing that she named Christian Science. Eddy records in the preface of Science and Health with Key to the Scriptures, her chief work on Scientific Christian healing, p. xi, that the college was opened, "under the seal of the Commonwealth, of Massachusetts, a law relative to colleges having been passed which enabled her to get this institution chartered for medical purposes." and it was located at 571 Columbus Avenue, Boston. USA. After teaching for almost seven years, Eddy closed this college in 1889 in order to devote herself to the revision of her book, Science and Health, but retained her charter and reopened the College in 1899 as an auxiliary to her Church.

The Christian Science Textbook
The College's founder, Mary Baker Eddy, in the preface to her book, Science and Health with Key to the Scriptures, which is the fundamental doctrinal Textbook on Christian Science, outlines a short history of the College as follows:

In 1881, she (Mary Baker Eddy) opened the Massachusetts Metaphysical College in Boston, under the seal of the Commonwealth, a law relative to colleges having been passed, which enabled her to get this institution chartered for medical purposes. No charters were granted to Christian Scientists for such institutions after 1883, and up to that date, hers was the only College of this character which had been established in the United States, where Christian Science was first introduced.

During seven years over four thousand students were taught by the author in this College. Meanwhile she was pastor of the first established Church of Christ, Scientist; President of the first Christian Scientist Association, convening monthly; publisher of her own works; and (for a portion of this time) sole editor and publisher of the Christian Science Journal, the first periodical issued by Christian Scientists. She closed her College, October 29, 1889, in the height of its prosperity with a deep-lying conviction that the next two years of her life should be given to the preparation of the revision of SCIENCE AND HEALTH, which was published in 1891. She retained her charter, and as its President, reopened the College in 1899 as auxiliary to her church.

Mark Twain in his book Christian Science
Mark Twain, in his critical and humorous book Christian Science, which was published in January, 1907, mentions an ad run in the Christian Science Journal for September, 1886:
MASSACHUSETTS METAPHYSICAL COLLEGE
REV. MARY BAKER G. EDDY, PRESIDENT
571 Columbus Avenue, Boston

The collegiate course in Christian Science metaphysical healing includes twelve lessons. Tuition, three hundred dollars.

Course in metaphysical obstetrics includes six daily lectures, and is open only to students from this college. Tuition, one hundred dollars.

Class in theology, open (like the above) to graduates, receives six additional lectures on the Scriptures, and summary of the principle and practice of Christian Science, two hundred dollars.
Normal (teachers) class is open to those who have taken the first course at this college; six daily lectures complete the Normal course. Tuition, two hundred dollars.

Judge Septimus J. Hanna
Upon Eddy's decease in December 1910, the By-laws of her church stipulated that the vice-president of the College would replace her as the College's President. This person was Judge Septimus J. Hanna who, with his wife, had been early students of Eddy and who occupied more positions of trust in the Christian Science Church than any other individual.

The Massachusetts Metaphysical College, 1882–1889
While Eddy stated that she taught over 4000 students at her college, she might have actually meant the sum total of all students taught under her authority as president as the college, including the thousands of students taught when the college was reopened as an auxiliary to her church in 1899 under the Church's Board of Education. By that time, other teachers such as Eddy's adopted son, Ebenezer Foster-Eddy, Edward A. Kimball and Judge Septimus J. Hanna had taught many subsequent classes. Kimball, for example, himself, taught over 150 classes. Foster-Eddy, as well as Gen. Erastus Newton Bates, had also taught during the period while the College was open. By 1889, her Normal (teachers class) students had also been teaching under her authority and under her signed certificates in the US and overseas. She could have also included in the number those who attended her public preaching at the time. In any case, John V. Dittimore, former director and clerk of her church and later Eddy critic, gives a far shorter list in his biography on Eddy published in 1932. His list is probably limited to those students, at the college, personally taught by Eddy alone in a classroom setting, until she turned over the teaching to others.

References

Christian Science in Massachusetts
19th century in Boston
South End, Boston